The women's duet artistic swimming competition at the 2002 Asian Games in Busan was held on 30 September and 2 October at the Sajik Swimming Pool.

Schedule
All times are Korea Standard Time (UTC+09:00)

Results

References

External links 
2002 Asian Games Official Report, Page 248
Duet Technical Routine Final
Duet Free Routine Final

Artistic swimming at the 2002 Asian Games